Guo Zichao(Chinese: 郭子超; Pinyin: Guō Zǐchāo) (born 25 January 1989) is a Chinese football player who plays as defender.

Club career
Guo played for the Guangzhou Pharmaceutical youth team before he was loaned to China League Two club Guangdong Sunray Cave in the 2007. He made an impression within the team as Guangdong Sunray Cave won promotion to the second tier at the end of the 2008 season. After spending three season at Guangdong Sunray Cave, he returned to Guangzhou for the 2010 league campaign. He made his debut for Guangzhou on 10 April 2010, in a 3–3 away draw against Pudong Zobon. However, due to fierce competition in the team, he made just two appearances in the 2010 season. Guo was the part of the squad to win the 2011 Chinese Super League title, but he did not play any match in this season.

Without too much chances in Guangzhou Evergrande, Guo moved back to Guangdong Sunray Cave on a free transfer in January 2012.

In January 2015, Guo transferred to fellow China League One side Jiangxi Liansheng.
In March 2018, Guo transferred to China League Two side Shenzhen Pengcheng.

Career statistics 
Statistics accurate as of match played 12 October 2019.

Honours

Club
Guangzhou Evergrande
Chinese Super League: 2011
China League One: 2010

References

1989 births
Living people
Chinese footballers
Footballers from Guangzhou
Guangdong Sunray Cave players
Guangzhou F.C. players
Jiangxi Beidamen F.C. players
Association football defenders
Chinese Super League players
China League One players
21st-century Chinese people